Adipostatin A is an alkylresorcinol, a type of phenolic lipids composed of long aliphatic chains and phenolic rings.  Chemically, it is similar in structure to urushiol, the irritant found in poison ivy.

Adipostatin A can be found in Gingko biloba fruits as well as in Streptomyces cyaneus. It is also found in cashew nutshell liquid (Anacardium occidentale), in Anacardium othonianum and in Ardisia elliptica.

It is an inhibitor of glycerol-3-phosphate dehydrogenase.

References 

Alkylresorcinols